A baldric is a shoulder belt used to carry a weapon.

Baldric (also spelled Balderic or Baldrick, in French Baudri or Baudry) is a masculine Germanic given name. It may refer to:

 Balderic of Montfaucon, a 7th-century French abbot and saint
 Baldric of Friuli, a 9th-century Duke of Friuli
 Balderic of Utrecht, bishop of Utrecht (917–975)
 Balderic I of Liège, bishop (955–959)
 Balderic II of Liège, bishop (1008–1018)
 Baldric of Noyon, bishop of Tournai (1099–1112)
 Baldric of Dol ( 1050–1130), abbot of Bourgueil
 Balderic of Florennes (d. c. 1163), biographer
 Baldric (horse), (1961–1986) a Thoroughbred racehorse
 Baldrick, several characters played by Tony Robinson on the BBC series Blackadder
 Baldrick the Rat King, the main character in the game Conan Exiles

See also
 St. Baldrick's Foundation, a US cancer research charity